
600 (DC) was a leap year starting on Friday (link will display the full calendar) of the Julian calendar. The denomination 600 for this year has been used since the early medieval period, when the Anno Domini calendar era became the prevalent method in Europe for naming years.

Events 
 By place 
 Europe 
 King Chlothar II of Neustria is defeated by his nephews, Theudebert II and Theuderic II, at Dormelles (approximate date).
 Germanic and Slavic peoples have tremendous population growth, with the Slavs colonizing the Balkan Peninsula.
 Rome continues as part of the Byzantine Empire. The Italian mainland is divided into independent cities and duchies.
 Venice continues as an independent realm, having been built up from fishing villages and settled by fugitives.
 Dorestad, lying in a fork between two branches of the Rhine, is established by the Franks as a trade center.
 King Agilulf of the Lombards and Queen Theodelinda build a palace complex at Monza, northeast of Milan.
 Moravians gain independence, by holding off the attacks from the Avars and the Franks who try to invade.
 According to the Ynglinga saga, king Ingvar of Sweden invades Adalsysla (present day Lääne County in Estonia), but is killed by the locals (approximate date).
 Smallpox arrives in Western Europe for the first time (approximate date).

 Britain 
 The Welsh bard, Prince Aneirin of the Pennines (North West of England), writes the poem, "Y Gododdin", recording the events of the Battle of Catraeth.
 The Britons of Strathclyde (Scotland), Wales and Cornwall are all separated by the Anglo-Saxon kingdoms.

 Asia 
 The first of the Japanese embassies to Imperial China is sent (approximate date).
 The Persians begin to use windmills for irrigation (approximate date).
 Namri Songtsen becomes the new king of Tibet (approximate date).
 Chaturanga is played in its current form in India (approximate date).
 Yangdi, a Sui emperor, extends the Grand Canal. He reportedly assumes power by poisoning his father. Ma Shu-mou, aka Mahu, was one of the canal overseers and was said to have eaten a steamed 2-year-old child each day he worked on the canal. On completion the canal extended for 1,100 miles. 5.5 million people were pressed into service to complete the 1,550 mile canal.
 Quill pens, made from the outer feathers of crows and other large birds, became popular. The first books are printed in China.
 The oldest inscription in Mon language dated from 600 AD. later found at Wat Phorang, Thailand.
 Mu becomes king of the Korean kingdom of Baekje.

 Mesoamerica 
 Loma Caldera (El Salvador) erupts, burying the Maya village of Joya de Cerén (approximate date).
 The Hopewell tradition (North America) ceases to be the dominant culture (approximate date).
 The city of Teotihuacan (Central Mexico) begins to grow unstable, as they exhaust their resources until their inevitable collapse (possibly caused by the Toltec) circa 700.
 Moche culture ends in the Andes (approximate date).
 Nazca culture ends in the Andes (approximate date).
 The Wari Empire is established in  The Andes (approximate date) 
 The Middle Horizon period starts in the Andes.

 Pacific Ocean 
 Early settlers from the Marquesas build the Alakoko fishpond and taro fields on Kauai, Hawaii.

 By topic 
 Arts and sciences 
 The Germanic peoples, due to the more abundant food supply available, use the "moldboard" plow, introduced by the Slavs in Eastern Europe. The plow works the land with horses and oxen.
 The earliest references to chess are made in the Persian work Karnamak-i-Artakhshatr-i-Papakan, and the Indian works of Subandhu's Vasavadatta and Banabhatta's Harsha Charitha.
 600-750 - Maguey Bloodletting Ritual, fragment of a fresco from Teotihuacan, Mexico, is made. Teotihuacan culture. It is now kept at the Cleveland Museum of Art.
 600-900 - Palace and Temple of the Inscriptions (tomb-pyramid of K'inich Janaab' Pakal), Palenque, Mexico, are built. Maya culture.
 600-900 - Cylindrical vessel is made. Maya culture. It is now kept at the Princeton University Art Museum, New Jersey.
 The Navigatio Sancti Brendani Abbatis (Voyage of St. Brendan the Abbott) recounts a 7-year trip to a land across the sea by the Irish saint and a band of acolytes about this time.

 Religion 
 Feb 16 - Pope Gregory the Great decrees "God bless You" as the religiously correct response to a sneeze.
 Pope Gregory I codifies what comes to be known as the Gregorian chant.
 Construction on the monastery of St. Catherine is begun on Mount Sinai.
 Irish missionaries preach in Scotland and Germany (approximate date).
 Chinese-influenced sculptures of Buddha begin to be created in Japan.
 Sumatra, Java, and the surrounding islands are converted to Buddhism.
 Augustine of Canterbury converts Æthelberht of Kent to Christianity (approximate date).
 Nubian rulers become Christian (approximate date).

 World 
 The population of the Earth rises to about 208 million people (approximate date).

Births 
 September 11 – Yuknoom the Great a Maya ruler of Calakmul
 Ali ibn Abi Talib, Muslim caliph and Shī‘ah imām (approximate date)
 Audomar, bishop of Thérouanne (approximate date)
 Bhāskara I, Indian mathematician (approximate date)
 Birinus, bishop of Dorchester (approximate date)
 Candrakīrti, Indian Madhyamaka philosopher
 Cunibert, bishop of Cologne (approximate date)
 Judoc, Breton noble and Catholic saint (d. 668)
 Li Shimin, son of Chinese General Li Yuan (the Duke of Tang) 
 Remaclus, bishop of Maastricht (approximate date)
 Wandregisel, Frankish monk and abbot (approximate date)
 Yan Liben, Chinese painter (approximate date)

Deaths 
 March 13 - Leander, bishop of Seville possibly in 601)
 Aedh Buidhe, king of Uí Maine (Ireland)
 Beop, king of Baekje (Korea)
 Bhavavarman I, king of Cambodia
 Cainnech of Aghaboe, Irish abbot and saint (b. c.515)
 Uatu mac Áedo, king of Connacht (Ireland)
 Venantius Fortunatus, bishop of Poitiers, one of the last representatives of Classical Latin poetry
 Yang Jun, prince of the Sui Dynasty (b. 571)

References